Sicyopterus franouxi is a species of goby endemic to Madagascar where it is only found in fresh waters. This species can reach a length of  SL.

References

franouxi
Freshwater fish of Madagascar
Endemic fauna of Madagascar
Taxa named by Jacques Pellegrin
Fish described in 1935
Taxonomy articles created by Polbot